Lynn S. Adelman (born October 1, 1939) is an American lawyer, judge, and former politician. He has served as a United States district judge for the United States District Court for the Eastern District of Wisconsin, since December 1997. Earlier in his career, he served 20 years in the Wisconsin State Senate, representing southwest Milwaukee County and neighboring municipalities.

Early life and education

Born in Milwaukee, Wisconsin, Adelman received an Artium Baccalaureus degree from Princeton University in 1961 and a Bachelor of Laws from Columbia Law School in 1965.

Career 
He was a research assistant at Columbia from 1965 to 1966. He was a trial attorney for the Legal Aid Society of Wisconsin from 1967 to 1968, and then entered private practice in Milwaukee in 1968. In 1993, Adelman represented Todd Mitchell, a black man convicted of a racially motivated attack against a 14-year old white boy, in Wisconsin v. Mitchell, a landmark first amendment case.

Political career

Adelman ran for Congress unsuccessfully three times, in 1974 in the general election, and in primaries in 1982 and in 1984 in a special election. He was a Democratic member of the Wisconsin State Senate from 1977 to 1997. Adelman was also on the Judiciary Committee, Alcohol and Drug Abuse Committee, and the Highway Safety Committee of the State Senate.

Federal judicial service
Adelman was nominated by President Bill Clinton on September 8, 1997, to a seat on the United States District Court for the Eastern District of Wisconsin vacated by Judge Thomas John Curran. He received a hearing by the United States Senate Committee on the Judiciary on October 29, 1997.  He was confirmed by the United States Senate on November 13, 1997, and received his commission on December 23, 1997.

Notable cases

Frank, et al vs Walker

The Wisconsin Voter ID law was a law passed by then Wisconsin governor Scott Walker in 2011. This law made voters of Wisconsin show a state-issued photo ID at the polls before they could vote. The reasoning behind this law was that Scott Walker wanted to stop the voter fraud that was allegedly happening within the state of Wisconsin. Adelman ruled, on April 29, 2014, that this law violated the fourteenth amendment and thus the law was unconstitutional. Adelman made this ruling because in the trial he saw no evidence of voter fraud and concluded that the law was unfair to minority voters because "Blacks and Latinos are more likely than whites to lack an ID".

Adelman was overturned on appeal with the Appeals Court offering a particularly stunning rebuke: “the district judge found as a fact that the majority of the Supreme Court was wrong about benefits such as better record keeping and promoting public confidence. Maybe that testimony will eventually persuade the Justices themselves, but in our hierarchical judicial system a district court cannot declare a statute unconstitutional just because he thinks (with or without the support of a political scientist) that the dissent was right and the majority wrong.” [Frank v. Walker, 768 F.3d 744, 750 (7th Cir. 2014)] The Panel continued: “The district judge heard from one political scientist, whose view may or may not be representative of the profession's. After a majority of the Supreme Court has concluded that photo ID requirements promote confidence, a single district judge cannot say as a “fact” that they do not, even if 20 political scientists disagree with the Supreme Court.” [
Frank v. Walker, 768 F.3d 744, 750 (7th Cir. 2014)]

Johnny Kimble vs Wisconsin's Department of Workforce Development, et al.

In this case Johnny Kimble sued former Equal Rights Division Secretary Sheehan Donoghue for not giving him a pay raise based on his race and gender. The Equal Rights Division job is to investigate discrimination claims and to judge whether the claim of discrimination is true. Johnny Kimble is an ex employee of the Equal Rights Division and ran the office in Milwaukee. Sheehan Donoghue was appointed to this position in 1991 by then governor of Wisconsin Tommy Thompson. Adelman's ruling on this case was that Johnny Kimble was denied pay raises because of his race and that the Department of Workforce Development was to pay Johnny Kimble what he lost. This ruling was made on February 25, 2010. Adelman said that Sheehan Donoghue made statements that contradicted to what she said and what other witnesses said, she also got defensive and evasive during the questioning, and the evidence on the case did not support her claims. The evidence they found was when the Milwaukee office did well she credited the office, not Johnny, but when the Madison office did well she credited the section chief, who was white. Also, whenever Johnny said they need technical support she ignored him, but when it was a white employee, she promised help.

St. Augustine School v. Evers

In June 2017, Adelman found that Tony Evers, then Superintendent of Public Instruction of Wisconsin, did not violate the Constitution's Free Exercise Clause nor its Establishment Clause when he denied bussing to an independent Catholic school because there was a nearby archdiocesan school. In his opinion, Adelman referenced Wikipedia articles on Traditionalist Catholic and Montessori education. His judgment was affirmed by a divided panel of the United States Court of Appeals for the Seventh Circuit in October 2018.

United States vs. Sujata Sachdeva

In this trial Koss Corporation's Chief Financial Advisor Sujata Sachdeva is charged with embezzling $34 million from the company. The other person involved on the embezzlement is Julie Mulvaney who was a senior accountant at Koss Corporation. The Koss Corporation is a manufacturer of headphones. Sachdeva used almost all of the $34 million she embezzled, from the Koss Corporation, to go on a wild shopping spree. The shopping spree consisted of shopping at designer, jewelry, department stores, and other high-end retailers. Sachdeva, along with Mulvaney, tried to cover up the embezzlement by creating false accounting records. Mulvaney created falsified journal records to cover Sachdeva's spending spree. Sachdeva's attorney's argued that Sachdeva was is mentally ill with alcoholism, diagnosed bipolar disorder, and a shopping addiction, when she went on the shopping spree. The sentence the federal prosecutor wanted was 15–20 years in prison, and the lawyers for Sachdeva wanted the sentenced reduce to 6–7 years in prison, because of her mental condition. Adelman sentenced Sachdeva to 11 years in federal prison on November 17, 2010. Adelman gave some leniency to Sachdeva because of her cooperation with the FBI.

United States vs. William White

This case is about William White, White is a Neo-Nazi who runs the Virginia-based American Nationalist Socialist Workers Party. White posted the address, name, and telephone numbers of a juror in Chicago who convicted a white supremacist, in 2004, to his website. The prosecutors claimed that White did this in hopes that the juror would be harmed for the conviction of the white supremacist. Adelman at first dismissed the indictment of White, because he did not threaten or actually caused harm to the man and he obtained the information legally, and that what White did was covered over the First Amendment. This judgement by Adelman was overturned and White went on to trial and was convicted by a jury in Chicago. After this sentencing Adelman reversed it for the same reasons he dismissed the case in the first place. Then on February 20, 2013, Adelman did sentence White to three and half years in prison for soliciting violence to a juror. When this sentencing happened, White was already in jail for other threats and intimidation practices.

Criticism of the Supreme Court under John Roberts

In February 2020, Adelman wrote an article criticizing the recent record of the Supreme Court of the United States under Chief Justice John Roberts The article singled out Chief Justice Roberts and accused him of actively participating in "undermining American democracy," through activist decisions on voting rights and campaign finance by corporate interests. Adelman wrote, "Instead of doing what it can to ensure the maintenance of a robust democratic republic, the Court's decisions ally it with the most anti-democratic currents in American politics, forces that would be pleased if unlimited money could be spent on elections and if minorities could be deterred from voting."

The article specifically cited a number of partisan 5-4 decisions, such as Shelby County v. Holder, (which struck down part of the Voting Rights Act of 1965), Rucho v. Common Cause, (which decided that federal courts could not rule on cases of gerrymandering), Citizens United v. FEC, (which allowed unlimited corporate spending on elections), and Janus v. AFSCME (which held that it was unconstitutional for public employee unions to require collective bargaining fees). The article created waves in legal circles because of the unusually blunt criticism of the Court coming from a sitting federal judge. Legal scholar Jonathan Turley argued that the article makes "a better case of bias against himself than he does Chief Justice John Roberts" and noted previous articles where Adelman had also directly criticized conservatives while serving as a federal judge. The Judicial Counsel for the Seventh Circuit censured Judge Adelman for writing this article.

Consideration for Seventh Circuit

On January 22, 2010, United States Senators Herb Kohl and Russ Feingold forwarded four names to the Obama White House for consideration to fill the vacancy on the United States Court of Appeals for the Seventh Circuit created when Judge Terence T. Evans assumed senior status. Adelman was recommended along with Victoria F. Nourse, Richard Sankovitz and Dean Strang, but was not selected for the spot.

Electoral history

U.S. House of Representatives (1974)

| colspan="6" style="text-align:center;background-color: #e9e9e9;"| Primary Election, September 10, 1974

| colspan="6" style="text-align:center;background-color: #e9e9e9;"| General Election, November 5, 1974

Wisconsin Senate (1976, 1980)

| colspan="6" style="text-align:center;background-color: #e9e9e9;"| General Election, November 2, 1976

| colspan="6" style="text-align:center;background-color: #e9e9e9;"| General Election, November 4, 1980

U.S. House of Representatives (1982, 1984)

| colspan="6" style="text-align:center;background-color: #e9e9e9;"| Primary Election, September 14, 1982

| colspan="6" style="text-align:center;background-color: #e9e9e9;"| General Election, November 2, 1982

| colspan="6" style="text-align:center;background-color: #e9e9e9;"| Primary Election, February 21, 1984

| colspan="6" style="text-align:center;background-color: #e9e9e9;"| General Election, April 3, 1984

Wisconsin Senate (1984)

| colspan="6" style="text-align:center;background-color: #e9e9e9;"| General Election, November 6, 1984

See also
 List of Jewish American jurists

References

External links

 
 

1939 births
Living people
Princeton University alumni
Columbia Law School alumni
Democratic Party Wisconsin state senators
Lawyers from Milwaukee
Judges of the United States District Court for the Eastern District of Wisconsin
United States district court judges appointed by Bill Clinton
20th-century American judges
21st-century American judges